Tord Göte Lundstrom (born 4 March 1945) is a retired Swedish professional ice hockey player and coach. Lundström won the Swedish Championship nine times playing for Brynäs IF, he also played for the Detroit Red Wings of the National Hockey League (NHL).

In 2011, Lundstrom was inducted into the IIHF Hall of Fame.

Career

Growing up in Kiruna, Sweden, Lundström attributed his love of hockey began after watching Eilert Määttä win the 1957 World Cup. Although he played hockey, Lundström was also interested in football and wrestling.

At 18, Lundström played his last season for Kiruna AIF before moving to Brynäs. That same year, he made his national team debut in November 1963. In his national team career, Lundström played in 200 games, including nine IIHF World Championships and the Olympic Games. He competed as a member of the Sweden men's national ice hockey team at the 1968 and 1972 Winter Olympics. Lundström then moved to North America where he joined the Detroit Red Wings of the National Hockey League (NHL) for the 1973–94 season. During that season, he became the second Swedish forward to score an NHL goal. After injuring his shoulder, Lundström broke his contract and left the NHL to join the London Lions in England for the rest of the season. He subsequently returned to Brynäs IF for the 1974–1975 season.

After retiring as a player, Lundström turned to coaching before working as a property manager in 2010. In 2011, he was inducted into the IIHF Hall of Fame and later the Swedish Hockey Hall of Fame. His number was also retired by Brynäs IF.

Career statistics

Regular season and playoffs

International

References

External links

1945 births
Brynäs IF players
Detroit Red Wings players
Ice hockey players at the 1968 Winter Olympics
Ice hockey players at the 1972 Winter Olympics
Living people
Olympic ice hockey players of Sweden
Swedish ice hockey coaches
Swedish ice hockey left wingers
London Lions (ice hockey) players
IIHF Hall of Fame inductees